Subhash Chandran (born 1972) born in Kerala, India, is a Malayalam novelist, short story writer and journalist best known for the 2010 novel Manushyanu Oru Aamukham. His stories "Vadhakramam", "Sanmargam", "Parudeesa Nashtam" and "Gotham"  have been adapted into films. He is the only writer to get Kerala Sahitya Akademi Award for both his debut story collection (2001) and debut novel (2011). 
 
The Malayalam feature film Laptop is an adaptation of the short story "Parudeesa Nashtam".

Life and career 
Subhash Chandran was born to Chandrasekharan Pillai and Ponnamma in 1972 in Kadungalloor, near Alwaye, Kerala. After completing his PG in Malayalam and securing the first rank from Mahatma Gandhi University, he ventured into writing. In 1994, his story "Ghatikarangal Nilaykkunna Samayam" won an award instituted by Mathrubhumi Vishuppathippu. He has won numerous other awards including Kendra Sahitya Akademi Award, Kerala Sahitya Akademi Award, Vayalar Award, Odakkuzhal Award and Confederation of Tamil Nadu Malayali Associations (CTMA) literary prize for outstanding young writers. He was the only Malayalam writer to feature in the list of outstanding young Indian writers compiled by The Times of India. He is the first and only writer who received the prestigious Kerala Sahitya Akademi Award for both his debut story collection and debut novel in 2001 and 2011 respectively. The English translation of his novel Manushyanu Oru Aamukham 'A preface To Man' published by Harper Collins in 2016 won Crossword Book Award. Subhash Chandran got the Keerthi Mudra Award by Asianet channel for his outstanding contributions over the last two decades in Malayalam literature.
He is married to Jayashree and has two children.

Manushyanu Oru Amukham 

Subhash Chandran is best known for authoring the 2010 novel Manushyanu Oru Amukham. The novel is set in Thachanakkara, a fictitious village and has the central character named Jithendran. The novel was originally serialised in Mathrubhumi Weekly in 2009. The novel was published as a book by DC Books in 2010. It was a critical success and, to date, remains one of the best-selling books in Malayalam. The novel won numerous awards including the Vayalar Award (2015), Kendra Sahithya Academy Award (2015) Kerala Sahitya Akademi Award (2011) Odakkuzhal Award (2011), FOKANA Award (2012), Bhasha Institute's Basheer Puraskaaram(2012) and Kovilan Puraskaaram (2012). In 2016, the novel was translated into English(A Preface to Man).

Film adaptations 
Four of his stories have been adapted into films. Based on the story "Vadhakramam", Pune Film Institute produced a short film that won a special jury mention in Rio de Janeiro Film Festival. The Malayalam feature film Laptop is an adaptation of the short story "Parudeesa Nashtam". His story "Sanmargam" was filmed as A Knife in the Bar in Malayalam while the story "Guptham" was filmed as Akasmikam by George Kithu, in which Swetha Menon played a role.

Bibliography

Manushyanu Oru Aamukham - Novel, DC Books
Samudrashila - Novel, Mathrubhumi Books
Ghatikarangal Nilakkunna Samayam - Short stories, DC Books
Parudeesa Nashtam - Short stories collection, DC Books
Thalpam - Short stories, DC Books
Bloody Mary - Short stories, DC Books
Vihitham- Short stories, Mathrubhumi books
Madhyeyingane-  Vignettes, Mathrubhumi Books
Kaanunnanerathu - Vignettes, Mathrubhumi Books
Das Capital - Memoirs, Mathrubhumi Books

Awards and achievements

 2001: Kerala Sahitya Akademi Award for Story - Ghatikarangal Nilaykunna Samayam
 2009: Abu Dhabi Sakthi Award (Story) - Parudeesa Nashtam
 2011: Kerala Sahitya Akademi Award for Novel - Manushyanu Oru Amukham
 2011: Odakkuzhal Award - Manushyanu Oru Amukham
 2014: Kendra Sahitya Akademi Award - Manushyanu Oru Amukham
 2014: Library Council Sahitya Puraskaram
 2015: Vayalar Award - Manushyanu Oru Amukham
 2015: Oman Indian Social Club's Pravasa Kairali Sahitya Award
 2017: Abu Dhabi Sakthi Award (Drama) - Onnaramanikoor
 2019: Padmarajan Award - Samudrashila
2020: O. V. Vijayan award for best novel –  Samudrashila

References

External links
 Profile

1972 births
21st-century Indian novelists
Indian male novelists
Indian male short story writers
Malayalam-language writers
Malayalam novelists
Writers from Kochi
Living people
Recipients of the Kerala Sahitya Akademi Award
Recipients of the Sahitya Akademi Award in Malayalam
People from Aluva
21st-century Indian short story writers
Novelists from Kerala
21st-century Indian male writers
Recipients of the Abu Dhabi Sakthi Award